The Cloth Peddler or Arşın Mal Alan may refer to several Azerbaijani films and plays.

The Cloth Peddler (1917 film)
The Cloth Peddler (1945 film)